Railroad Wash is a seasonal stream or wash and a tributary of the Gila River.

References

Railroad Wash (Gila River)
Rivers of Arizona
Railroad Wash (Gila River)
Rivers of New Mexico